Guido Joe "Wedo" Martini (July 1, 1913 – October 28, 1970) was a Major League Baseball pitcher who played in  with the Philadelphia Athletics. He batted and threw right-handed.

External links

1913 births
1970 deaths
Major League Baseball pitchers
Baseball players from Alabama
Philadelphia Athletics players